Pasay Road station is a railway station located on the South Main Line in Makati, Metro Manila, Philippines. It is one of two stations (the other is Santa Mesa) in the line to have its own access road. It is named after Pasay Road, the old name of the Makati section of the adjacent Arnaiz Avenue.

The station is the tenth station from Tutuban and is one of three stations serving Makati, the other two being Dela Rosa and EDSA. It is the only station in Makati, and the only station between España and Alabang, which serves intercity trains, being a stopping point for the Bicol Express and Mayon Limited.

In addition to having its own dedicated access road, Pasay Road station is also one of three stations (the others being Santa Mesa and España) to have its original platforms extended and raised in order to accommodate new PNR diesel multiple units. The original platforms have been retained for the use of Commuter Express locomotives and especially for intercity trains.

Nearby landmarks
It is near Waltermart Makati, the Don Bosco Technical Institute, Makati Cinema Square, and several condominium developments both complete and under construction, such as The Columns Legazpi Village, the Cityland Pasong Tamo Tower, Avida Towers San Lorenzo and The Beacon. Further away from the station are the Ayala Center, the Makati Central Business District, Ayala Museum, other condominium developments such as The Shang Grand Tower and the BSA Tower, and major office buildings such as Ayala Tower One, and the Philamlife Tower.

Transportation links
Pasay Road station is accessible by jeepneys plying the Chino Roces and Arnaiz Avenue routes, as well as buses plying the South Luzon Expressway route.

History
Pasay Road was opened on June 21, 1908 as Culi-culi station, named after the barrio of the same name (the present-day Barangay Pio del Pilar) where it is located. Originally part of the Batangas Line, it is the first railroad station in Makati, which was then a town named San Pedro de Macati in Rizal. It also served as the terminal of the defunct Manila Railroad branch towards Nielson Field. A wooden station building and raised elevation was built in 1924, while the yard trackage was increased.

The station building and platforms were renovated in 1975 as Pio Del Pilar station, following the track duplication of the line from Paco up to this station. The track duplication of the line was further extended, reaching Sucat by 1978.

A new platform was built in 2009 north of the old station building.

Station Layout

References

Philippine National Railways stations
Railway stations in Metro Manila
Buildings and structures in Makati
Makati Central Business District
Railway stations opened in 2009